侍 is a Chinese character with meanings:
 serve, attend upon
 attendant, servant

It may refer to:
Samurai
Name for offices in charge of royal affairs during the Joseon Dynasty